Intermediate fibers, also known as fast oxidative-glycolytic fibers, are fast twitch muscle fibers which have been converted via endurance training. These fibers are slightly larger in diameter, have more mitochondria as well as a greater blood supply and more endurance than typical fast twitch fibers. Most of the body's muscles are composed of these intermediate fibers.

References
 Visualizing Human Biology, Kathleen Anne Ireland, David J. Tenenbaum, raken jilani

Muscular system